Guam National Football Stadium is a multi-use stadium in the village of Hagåtña in the United States territory of Guam.  It is currently used mostly for football matches.  The stadium holds 1,000.

References

Football venues in Guam
Athletics (track and field) venues in Guam